Kiernan Frank Dewsbury-Hall (born 6 September 1998) is an English professional footballer who plays as a midfielder for  club Leicester City.

Career
Dewsbury-Hall was born in Nottingham and grew up in Shepshed, Leicestershire. He joined the Leicester City Academy in 2006 aged eight from Shepshed Dynamo Warriors of the Leicester Mutual League, who he played for at under-8 and under-9 levels. He signed his first professional contract with the club in 2017 and in 2019 was named as the development squad player of the year. Dewsbury-Hall made his first-team debut in a 1–0 FA Cup victory over Brentford on 25 January 2020, coming on as a substitute for Kelechi Iheanacho. Two days later, he joined Blackpool on loan for the rest of the 2019–20 season. He scored a consolation goal on his debut the following day in a 2–1 away defeat to Wycombe Wanderers, after replacing Grant Ward at half time.

Dewsbury-Hall signed a new four-year contract with Leicester on 16 October 2020 and joined Luton Town on a season-long loan. At the end of the season, he won four awards at Luton's end of season awards ceremony, including Players' Player of the Season.

He made his Premier League debut on 28 August 2021, coming on as a substitute for James Maddison in a 2–1 away win at Norwich City. On 10 December, he scored his first goal for Leicester City, in a 3–2 defeat at Napoli in a Europa League group stage match. He scored his first Premier League goal on 10 April 2022, in a 2–1 home win against Crystal Palace.

On 24 June 2022, Dewsbury-Hall signed a new long term contract with Leicester City lasting until 2027.

Career statistics

Honours
Leicester City
FA Community Shield: 2021

Individual
 UEFA Europa Conference League Team of the Season: 2021–22

References

External links

Profile at the Leicester City F.C. website

1998 births
Living people
Footballers from Nottingham
People from Shepshed
Footballers from Leicestershire
English footballers
Association football midfielders
Leicester City F.C. players
Blackpool F.C. players
Luton Town F.C. players
English Football League players
Premier League players